Kolyvan ( or ) has various referents:

Placenames 
The name of several  inhabited localities in Russia.

 Urban localities
 Kolyvan, Novosibirsk Oblast, a work settlement in Kolyvansky District of Novosibirsk Oblast
 Rural localities
 Kolyvan, Altai Krai, a selo in Kolyvansky Selsoviet of Kuryinsky District of Altai Krai
 Kolyvan, Samara Oblast, a selo in Krasnoarmeysky District of Samara Oblast
 Historical places
 Kolyvan, an ancient Russian name of the city of Tallinn in present-day Estonia

Personal names 
 Kolyvan, a bogatyr who appears in various Russian byliny